La Tourne (el. 1170 m.) is a high mountain pass in the Jura Mountains in the canton of Neuchâtel in Switzerland.

It connects Les Ponts-de-Martel and Montmollin. The pass road has a maximum grade of 10 percent.

See also
 List of highest paved roads in Europe
 List of mountain passes
List of the highest Swiss passes

References

Tourne
Tourne
Mountain passes of the canton of Neuchâtel